Petr Pavlík (born 22 July 1987) is a Czech professional football who plays as a centre back.

Career

Pohronie
Pavlík's signing with Pohronie was announced on in January 2020. His transfer was requested by his former coach Mikuláš Radványi, with whom he had a spell with Spartak Myjava. He arrived on a half-season loan from Zbrojovka Brno. Pavlík was featured frequently in winter preparatory friendly games. He made his competitive debut for Pohronie in Fortuna Liga on 15 February 2020 in a match against Nitra at pod Zoborom. Pavlík completed 90 minutes of the match. This was a match that was dubbed as a six-point match, as both teams were just one point apart, in the relegation zone, with Nitra in 11th and Pohronie in 12th place.

Personal life
Pavlík resides with his family in Senica, Slovakia.

References

External links

1987 births
Living people
Sportspeople from Opava
Czech footballers
Czech expatriate footballers
Czech Republic youth international footballers
Association football defenders
FC Baník Ostrava players
MFK Vítkovice players
MFK Karviná players
FC Hlučín players
FC Zbrojovka Brno players
Czech First League players
Czech National Football League players
Kasımpaşa S.K. footballers
Samsunspor footballers
Süper Lig players
TFF First League players
FK Senica players
FK Pohronie players
Spartak Myjava players
Slovak Super Liga players
Expatriate footballers in Slovakia
Expatriate footballers in Turkey
Czech expatriate sportspeople in Turkey
Czech expatriate sportspeople in Slovakia